(February 25, 1922 – July 2, 2015) was the chairman of the former Japan Socialist Party, now known as the Social Democratic Party of Japan. He was elected to the position in 1991. Tanabe was from the right wing of the party and was a reformer. He served in the Japanese House of Representatives 11 times. Tanabe was a supporter of giving Japanese aide to deal with the lack of food in North Korea. He was also supportive of apologizing for Japan's behaviour during World War II and of giving reparations to those in Asian countries. He died in 2015.

References

2015 deaths
Social Democratic Party (Japan) politicians
Members of the House of Representatives (Japan)
1922 births